Penicillium burgense is a fungus species of the genus of Penicillium.

See also
List of Penicillium species

References

burgense
Fungi described in 1990